Anita Basnet (Nepali: अनिता बस्नेत) is  Nepali footballer who plays for Sethu in IWL and represents the Nepal women's national football team.

International goals

Honours

Club
Sethu FC
Indian Women's League: 2018–19

References

Living people
Nepal women's international footballers
Nepalese women's footballers
Women's association football midfielders
Indian Women's League players
Sethu FC players
2000 births
South Asian Games silver medalists for Nepal
South Asian Games medalists in football
Nepalese expatriate sportspeople in India
Nepalese expatriate women's footballers
Expatriate women's footballers in India